is a 2019 anime television series produced by MAPPA and Tezuka Productions based on the manga of the same name by Osamu Tezuka, and is a re-adaptation of the previous 1969 series. The adaptation departs from the source material in several ways, but follows the basic premise of the manga: a young ronin, named Hyakkimaru, along with a young child, Dororo, must face multiple demons in Sengoku-era Japan who have stolen his various body parts in order to get them back.

The main innovation was the new portrayal of Hyakkimaru, a weaker samurai than the one written by Tezuka with director Kazuhiro Furuhashi among other staff member conceiving the alternate of take of the young swordsman becoming a new person following his journey with Dororo in a similar manner to buddy films. The series is also present in English release through Sentai Filmworks and Amazon Prime.

The series was well received by critics from anime who often listed it as one of the best anime from 2019. The characterization of Hyakkimaru and Dororo was often praised as well as how they develop as how the former's family is also explored. However, some writers felt some episodic narratives did not have the same appeal as the earlier ones.

Plot
During the Sengoku period, a feudal lord has his newborn son's organs and limbs sacrificed to the twelve demons gods in exchange of prosperity for his people. The baby is abandoned but found by the doctor Jukai who specializes in giving people prosthetic limbs. Jukai adopts the baby and gives him limbs. When the child grows up, he is attacked by demons and develops the ability of seeing their silhouette to fight back. After defeating his first enemy, the now teenager regains his ability of feeling pain. Jukai names the teenager Hyakkimaru and sends him off on journey to regain his body. Along the way, Hyakkimaru meets a child named Dororo who decides to follow him, teaching him how to live and fight demons in exchange for food when visiting villages.

As the duo fight demons, Hyakkimaru recovers his hearing which causes him to fall in love with the young singer Mio who had been selling her body to soldiers. Believing she is a spy, enemy soldiers kill her and the orphans in her care. This ignites a deep rage within Hyakkimaru, and he kills all but one of the soldiers. Dororo calms him and gives him a bag of rice from the late girl, which he stores in his clothing. Hyakkimaru also meets his family: his father Daigo Kagemitsu, his mother Nui no Kata and his younger brother Tahomaru. As Daigo fears the land will be destroyed once Hyakkimaru recovers his body, he and his son attempt to kill him without success. As Hyakkimaru and Dororo continue their journey, the former becomes obsessed with recovering his body which scares the latter when a village is destroyed. Jukai makes his son realize that he needs a person to rely on a person to live to avoid being lost in wrath and Hyakkimaru chooses Dororo who had left him. Hyakkimaru follows Dororo who had been captured by bandits to use her father's hidden treasure and in the meantime fight his brother again for a brief time again.

Although now feeling more affection towards Dororo, Hyakkimaru succumbs to his wrath when he is unable to save Dororo, who nearly drowns, because he does not have real arms. Hyakkkimaru returns to Daigo's village to recover his last body parts and once again battles Tahomaru and his assistants Mutsu and Hyogo who also made a pact with the demons to kill him. As Mutsu and Hyogo die, Hyakkimaru recovers his arms and fights Tahomaru in his castle on fire. Through his brother's despair, Hyakkimaru sees parallels between their lives and spares him. Tahomaru rips off his own eyes to make Hyakkimaru recover his vision and Nui no Kata and Jukai lead him to Dororo as they die in the castle with Tahomaru. With Daigo's land destroyed, the feudal lord attempts to offer his son once again when Hyakkimaru spares him as he claims both can redeem themselves from killing people. Dororo then uses her father's treasure to rebuild the village while Hyakkimaru goes on a journey and accomplish Mio's dream of a field. The series ends with the grown Dororo running to happily welcome the returning Hyakkimaru.

Main cast

Hyakkimaru. Voiced by Hiroki Suzuki, and Adam Gibbs. As a result of his character not having too many lines, Suzuki was given multiple advices by MAPPA during recording of the episodes. Among many lines he enjoyed how Hyakkimaru starts calling Dororo by his name, something that he does by different range of emotions. He compared the duo's relationship similar to that of a buddy film and felt that the series' message involves humanity as Hyakkimaru becomes weaker every time he restores a part of his body. Suzuki said Hyakkimaru sounded too ikemen and was asked to tone it down. The actor said that Hyakkimaru never attempts to sound cool and instead is more charming when talking with Dororo, citing their meeting in the second half of the series after the two split. 
Dororo. Voiced by Rio Suzuki, and Chaney Moore. Suzuki felt pressure about her being the youngest actor in the series but looked forward to her character's relationship with Hyakkimaru and their journey.
Biwamaru. Voiced by Mutsumi Sasaki, and James Belcher.
Daigo Kagemitsu. Voiced by Naoya Uchida, and David Wald.
Tahōmaru Voiced by Shōya Chiba, and Blake Jackson.
Jukai. Voiced by Akio Ōtsuka, and Ty Mahany. Otsuka had previously voiced Daigo Kagemitsu in the 2004 video game adaption.
Nuinokata. Voiced by Chie Nakamura, and Patricia Duran.

Production

Concept

Producer Manabu Otsuka said there are many charms of the anime Dororo, but he thinks the most important thing to convey is Hyakkimaru and Dororo, the two characters. It was a nice duo in the original, but the relationship between the two is quite different from the original. Hyakkimaru gradually regains his body and gradually recognizes the existence of Dororo. There are many hard depictions in the work, but Otsuka feels that there are many viewers who are healed by the interaction between the two people when they happen to be caught. He had discussions with draft artists Hiroyuki Asada and character designer Satoshi Iwataki so that modern fans would be interested in the design part first. Iwataki incorporated the soft movement expression and roundness of Tezuka into the range of Asada's painting, and the feeling of the Dororo moving around in the animation. Everyone was conscious of the fact that Dororo is cute, and I feel that it is directly conveyed to the current viewers. Being a fan of Tezuka's works, he was joyed with the idea of creating this anime. Among other staff members, Otsuka was glad Kazuhiro Furuhashi was directing the anime, based on his experience with the samurai anime Rurouni Kenshin, as well as Altair: A Record of Battles.

Scenario 
The character draft was the most difficult of the production staff. Hiroyuki Asada took the place and was glade since he is a fan of Tezuka's work. Kobayashi said at the time, he knew the title, but did not read the original. Hyakkimaru for the competition that he drew in a week was set to be older than now, and at a meeting after that, Furuhashi said there are too many Egui expressions, and that the design was cute. On the other hand, Asada said, he decided to draw Hyakkimaru in a way that is closer to the original work by Tezuka. Kobayashi adored the design presented as, when the storyboards and scripts were made, it felt easy to empathize with such character. Meanwhile, Dororo was considered an easier work to design than Hyakkimaru. Kobayashi said whether somebody writes a scenario or direct it, the work will change completely with just one piece of music. This time, Dororo was a work that tries to draw with as few lines as possible, so it was nicely enlivened with heavy music. Kobayashi was impressed that he felt it amazing. Asada considered the work as an historical drama. Since Hykakimaru was too different from Tezuka's work, the recovery of his body became the focus of the narrative and have his first line in the fifth episode.

Furuhashi considered creating the series a difficult job due to his portrayal of Hyakkimaru who is meant to look younger and more naive than in the 1969 series. While the series featured multiple episodic stories, Furuhashi made several to be focused on Daigo's family in order to combine with Hyakkimaru and Dororo's journey. When creating the series, Furuhashi read other works created by Osamu Tezuka. He was aided by Yasuko Kobayashi in order to properly handle the setting. As the story progresses, Hyakkimaru recovers lost parts of his body. Furuhashi decided that the first one he recovers should be the one that allows him to feel pain. In regards to messages, Furuhashi wanted to leave hidden content rather than having the cast explain it. The director cites episode 18 as an example of this as well as how the dynamic between Hyakkimaru and Dororo was written in order to properly develop the former in order to prepare him for his personal story arc.

Osada explained in an interview that Hyakkimaru's slender body frame is a deliberate effort to accentuate the image of him being a “ball-joined doll”. Moreover, Hyakkimaru's slender eyebrows are also deliberate. Akio Otsuka, who voiced Jukai, said in another anime series, they would have made it his prosthetic leg being taken, and made him grow back a good leg there. He thinks it is very much in style of this adaptation of manga that it just has to be his good leg being chewed away.

Audio
Regarding Yoshihiro Ike's work with music, Otsuka had a history with him so they agreed quickly. Ike had known the producer ever since a stage play from 2016. Sound director Kisuke Koizumi said a key characteristic of Dororo is that is has very few pieces of background music. The series makes do with just 30 pieces even though it runs for two cours. This is because the staff likes to expressing the feelings of characters with dialogue and facial expressions as much as possible. On the other hand, the music itself is epic-sounding as befitting a period drama. MAPPA made effort in sound effects for little things like – for example, the tiny movement when a character is about take a step forward. He thinks people enjoy the show more if they listen for sounds other than the dialogue. Ike claimed that for the soundtrack there were multiple requests that made his work challenging.

The opening theme  is performed by Queen Bee, while the ending theme  is performed by amazarashi.  "Kaen" involves the metaphor of dancing. This one was based on one of the singer's backgrounds. Coincidentally, the singer was surprised when learning that Hyakkimaru could see people's souls in the form of flames. The production side asked him to feature Japanese musical instruments a little more. In response, he thought it would be different to simply include the world view of Japanese, so he thought that the way the chorus was sung would sound like a Japanese instrument, and there was a conflict within me. The rap part was fun for him. "Sayonara Gokko" shows a mellow taste and lyrics that expresses the appearance of Hyakkimaru.

The second opening  is performed by Asian Kung-Fu Generation and the second ending theme  is performed by Eve. Masafumi Gotoh from Asian Kung-Fu Generation stated that he made the music with all his thoughts so as not to be ashamed of the original Tezuka manga. Meanwhile, Eve said that the song portrays the ugly appearance that was born, the confrontation with loneliness, the unyielding belief of oneself, the immeasurable depth of the eyes, the new emotions that arise from the communication of the heart with others, and the encounter and parting what is really important, in this cursed world of being eaten or eaten, now that we are regaining the deprived body. The lyrics portray the characterization of Hyakkimaru as he develops his own identity.

Themes

Taking place during the chaotic Sengoku period, the anime focuses on the tragedy on war and men's devotion towards religion. Crunchyroll noted that the series have  a heavy focus on Buddhism and the demons that threaten society often resulting in violence in most episodes with the heroic Hyakkimaru standing out as under complicated socio-political stakes with Daigo's devotion towards the demons representing the shifts in changing Buddhist attitudes toward these entities.

Anime News Network noted that there is the ideas involving the damage of the Onin War as the anime often addressed victims of wars regardless of age and poverty is common in villagers. The idea of yokai predated the arrival of Buddhism into Japan, but like how later Japanese Emperors were both high Shinto priests and devoted Buddhist practitioners, belief in yokai and adherence to the buddhas were never mutually exclusive. Although Daigo offers his son to the yokais, Buddhism still saves the recently born child from a dark fate with the first episode showing a Boddhisattva Kannon statue losing its head when Hyakkimaru is saved from being eaten.

Tor.com compared Hyakkimaru's life with the narratives created by Ursula K. Le Guin in regards to how Daigo uses his body as part of the bargain to obtain prosperity for his land. Although Hyakkimaru's quest to recover his body might give chaos back to the world, he is unwilling to be a guinea pig anymore as he expresses his desire to stop living in pain, something that clashes with the comments of other people close to him like Jukai who fears his adoptive son's being devoted to violence or Dororo because he is a victim of war. The website further compared the tragic world of Dororo with Le Guin's The Ones Who Walk Away from Omelas. Across both stories, the cast of the series express regrets in their choices which led to Hyakkimaru's chaotic life, giving the message that children should also express themselves.

Biggest in Japan considered Hyakkimaru's journey as an inversion from the hero's journey, rather than becoming a stronger person, he instead becomes weaker due to fighting with a more common body, and like other writers, cited his tragic story with Mio and friendship with as one of the series' biggest strengths as they further change the main character's personality. Hyakkimaru develops his own identity while fighting across the narrative.

Release

The 24-episode series was broadcast from January 7 to June 24, 2019, on Tokyo MX, BS11, and Jidaieki Senmon Channel,  and was streamed exclusively worldwide on Amazon Prime Video. The episodes were collected in two Blu-ray volumes released in Japan on May 22 and August 21, 2019.

Kazuhiro Furuhashi directed the series, with Yasuko Kobayashi handling series composition, Satoshi Iwataki handling character designs, and Yoshihiro Ike composing the music. Twin Engine produced the series. The soundtrack of the series was released on August 14, 2019 in two different editions. A guidebook featuring Hiroyuki Asada's art was released in Japan on August 2, 2019.

The series was licensed by Sentai Filmworks for an English release in March 2021. Sentai's deal includes distribution rights for the United States, Canada, United Kingdom, Australia, New Zealand, South Africa, Latin America, Spain, Portugal, the Netherlands, and Nordic and Scandinavian countries. The Blu-ray disk of the series was released by Sentai on June 29, 2021. Madman Entertainment released it in Australia on October 6, 2021.

Reception
Anime News Network listed Dororo as one of the best MAPPA series of all time, and was also listed as one of the best anime from 2019. The first Blu-ray volume sold	1,912 units in Japan. In the 4th Crunchyroll Anime Awards, Hyakkimaru was voted as one of the best protagonists and boy of the year while "Sayonara Gokko" was voted as one of the best ending sequences. Satoshi Iwataki was also voted as one of the best character designers. Only Iwataki won in a Dororo vote. Forbes also listed Dororo as one of the best series from its decade. Thrillist regarded it as one of the best anime series in Amazon Prime. Thrillist named the series one of the best anime of the 2010s, CL praising the action sequences, themes and visuals.

Early impressions of the series were positive with the handling of MAPPA's animation, the alterations to Hyakkimaru's portrayal and origins in comparison to Osamu Tezuka's manga and Dororo's personality. The handling of the tragic relationship between Hyakkimaru and Mio was earned similar response as the former is suddenly developed when meeting Mio though the dark twist was noted that it could negatively affect his future as well as the latter's occupation as a prostitute which was deemed too dark. Although the narrative uses the idea of villain of the week, RiceDigital and Popzara noted that Hyakkimaru changed almost in every episode due to he builds his own identity as he regains parts of his body, noting his meeting with Mio heavily affected his desire to restore his own body rather than defend his own body.

Dororo's backstory was also noted tragic not only for how the young child suffered following the death of his parents and it was shown how he created a stronger personality in order to fight for her life, acting like a male rather than a girl, though Fandom Post found it as obvious knowledge for the audience. His eventual reunion with the bandit Itachi who plans to steal his father's treasure using the map hidden on the child's back was noted for the story more moral tones as despite Itachi's cruel nature, the two protect one another from the young Shiranui. Despite Shiranui's twisted nature as he uses shark-like demons to feed on his preys, he still shows love towards them in tragic tones when Hyakkimaru kills one of them. These episodes were also noted to show the kind nature of the two leads, most notably Hyakkimaru as he shows more affection towards Dororo and Jukai. Dororo's continuous dynamic with Hyakkimaru as well as the growth of Hyakkimaru's younger brother, Tahomaru, were also praised as interesting subplots fow how the build up the main story.

In regards to the series' ending, Manga.Tokyo said he did not look forward to Hyakkimaru's hatred towards Daigo as the he still enjoyed deep bond between the leads rather than a possible tragedy. The series' finale felt rushed by Anime News Network for how Dororo's gender issues were not properly explored which is left ambiguous when Hyakkimaru compliments his look upon recovering his sight. Neverhtless, he praised the conclusion between Hyakkimaru's arc in regards to his family as he spares his brother and father, something that works as a result of his growth as a person. Fandom Post had similar commentaries in regards to Hyakkimaru's family and whether or not his mother needed to die in the fire as well as whether or not the continuous wars from the Sengoku will bring more harm the leads' life. In conclusion, the reviewer praised how MAPPA managed to improve on Tezuka's original manga by changing the characterization of the two leads despite noting issues in the series' production. Popzara enjoyed the series' animation because of how gruesome fights tend to be. Fandom Post noted that while some episodic stories work out, the series suffers fatigue in the second half as the characters focused stories felt stronger than the scenario and sometimes felt that Hyakkimaru was too overpowered when fighting demons. Although the animation remained consistently praised, the animation direction in Osamu Kobayashi's the televised airing of the 15th episode was not as positively received. Despite enjoying the scenario, UK Anime Network said that Dororo could have "from having a less staccato narrative" as well as a more balanced storytelling. He still recommended the series to Berserk and Demon Slayer: Kimetsu no Yaiba fans due to the heavy fights and narrative style.

Notes

References

External links
  
 

2019 anime television series debuts
Action anime and manga
Anime series based on manga
Dark fantasy anime and manga
Demons in anime and manga
Fiction about curses
Historical fantasy anime and manga
MAPPA
Osamu Tezuka anime
Sentai Filmworks
Television shows set in Japan
Television shows written by Yasuko Kobayashi
Tezuka Productions
Tokyo MX original programming
Yōkai in anime and manga